Harold Leslie Thornton, also known as "Harold The Kangaroo Thornton" and the self-proclaimed "Greatest Genius Who Ever Lived" (born 26 August 1915, Enfield, New South Wales; died on 3 April 2004) was an Australian artist.

Harold was the sixth child in a family of seven children. His father was John Nicholas Thornton, a tram conductor (born 1879 Lambton, NSW, died 1942 in Burwood), his mother was Anne (née Burgess, born 1885 Enfield, died 1953 Enfield).

Harold began studying art at a young age, attending both the Orban School of Art and the Julian Ashton School of art. He was prolific and his art career spanned more than 60 years from traditional portraits and landscapes, to surrealist-type art, and some art commentators classify Harold's later works to be in the Naive style, however, Erica Kubic-Vegter, a Dutch art historian, has stated that Harold had many styles during his career and has classified his later bright-coloured "psychedelic" works as Magic Realism. But Harold himself would have rejected any classification of his art and was once quoted as saying ‘…What do I paint: I have many styles, and change to suit the subject. My real painting is psychedelic. I don’t follow the old masters, no, I am one.’. He was an early Australian proponent of using bold, bright colours, and had an influence over artists such as Martin Sharp, Ken Done and Tim Gratton the body artist.

Harold became well known in Amsterdam in the early 1970s. He painted a mural on the 1st cannabis coffee shop, The Bulldog Nr. 90, in Amsterdam which he completed in December 1975. The Bulldog's owner, Henk de Vries, went on to open a string of The Bulldog Coffeeshops thanks to the famous mural on Nr. 90. Many of Harold's paintings adorn the Bulldog Hotel in Amsterdam.

Information sourced from Family History Records kept by Chris Osborne, great-nephew.

References

 
 
 Kal, Pienke, The Colorful Life of Harold Leslie Thornton alias The Kangaroo 1915-2004. Eindhoven: Lecturis, 2015

 
 
 

1915 births
2004 deaths
20th-century Australian painters
20th-century Australian male artists
Australian male painters